Paramacrauchenia is an extinct genus of proterotheriid litopterns from the Early Miocene of what is now Argentina and Chile. Its fossils have been found in the Sarmiento and Santa Cruz Formations of Argentina and Chile.

Taxonomy 
Paramacrauchenia was originally assigned to the family Macraucheniidae, however, recent studies now consider it a member of the family Proterotheriidae, where it is found to be a derived member, closely related to Lambdaconus.

Below is a phylogenetic tree of the Proterotheriidae, based on the work of McGrath et al. 2020.

 }}

References

Proterotheriids
Miocene mammals of South America
Colhuehuapian
Santacrucian
Neogene Argentina
Fossils of Argentina
Neogene Chile
Fossils of Chile
Fossil taxa described in 1939
Prehistoric placental genera
Golfo San Jorge Basin
Sarmiento Formation